State Road 337 (NM 337) is a state highway in the US state of New Mexico. NM 337's southern terminus is at NM 55 east of Tajique, and NM 337's northern terminus is north of the village of Tijeras, at Interstate 40 (I-40).

Major intersections

See also

References

337
Transportation in Torrance County, New Mexico
Transportation in Bernalillo County, New Mexico